Garbh Bheinn is a mountain in Scotland. Its name is Scots Gaelic for "rough mountain".

Ascents 

There are several possible routes of ascent. All of them are steep and likely to require scrambling in places. Although most present no technical difficulties in good conditions, careful route finding may be required when descending from the main summit, especially in mist. Most approaches start at the old bridge at the foot of its south east ridge, where there is parking space. From there, the best route of ascent may be up the crest of the ridge, or via a path to the north of this ridge and then up to the saddle between the main summit and its south east top. There are no constructed paths up or onto the ridge, but the boots of successive climbers have created steps which show and facilitate the way in some places, but disappear or are creating erosion in others.

References 
 The Corbetts and Other Scottish Hills, (SMC Guide) 
 Walkhighlands
 Walk in Scotland (archived)
 Outdoors Magic (archived)

Corbetts
Marilyns of Scotland
Mountains and hills of the Northwest Highlands